The phrase "all politics is local" is commonly used in United States politics. Variations of the phrase date back to 1932. Tip O'Neill, a former Speaker of the U.S. House of Representatives, is most closely associated with this phrase, although he did not originate it.

Meaning and applicability 
Andrew Gelman argues that the "local" refers to the fact that politicians "need local skills to win the primary election that gets them into their safe seat, and they need backroom political skills in the state legislature to keep their safe seats every 10 years." Gelman also argues, citing data for elections since 1968, that politics is "less local than it used to be."

Example
Chris Matthews, former chief of staff to Tip O'Neill, wrote about the strategy adopted in the 1982 Congressional elections. O'Neill's seat was challenged by Massachusetts lawyer Frank L. McNamara, Jr., who had financed most of his campaign with money from oil interests in Oklahoma and Texas. O'Neill played up the connections in the media by passing out literature highlighting McNamara's fundraising in Texas.

Later during those elections, O'Neill introduced a $1-billion jobs bill to the table. House Republican Leader Robert H. Michel of Peoria, Illinois, opposed the bill, but O'Neill delivered an address broadcast in Peoria that showed how many infrastructure problems in Peoria would be fixed by the bill. Matthews wrote that "by hitting his rival where he lived, O'Neill translated a wholesale debate over national economic policy to the local, retail level."

See also

Country (identity)
 Parochialism
 Pork barrel

References

Political catchphrases